Horace Williams Airport  was a public use airport located  north of the central business district of Chapel Hill, a city in Orange County, North Carolina, United States. It is owned by the University of North Carolina at Chapel Hill. Although most U.S. airports use the same three-letter location identifier for the FAA and IATA, this airport is assigned IGX by the FAA but has no designation from the IATA.

History 
Originally known as Martindale Field for Chapel Hill contractor Lee Martindale and one of the first airfields in North Carolina.  Then renamed "Chapel Hill Airport" and offered pilot training and air shows.  The airport was purchased by the university in 1940 and  renamed for Prof. Horace Williams, Chair of Mental and Moral Science (Philosophy) at the university during the first half the twentieth century, who also donated much of the land needed to expand the airport.

The airport was part of a large gift of land to the university by professor Horace Williams in the 1930s, and while the professor did not restrict the use of the property to airport use, it has been an airport since 1933. Presidents Ford and George H. Bush received Navy primary flight training at the airport.  President Kennedy visited UNC in October, 1961 and arrived and departed via Horace Williams Airport.

Facilities and aircraft 
It has one runway designated 9/27 with an asphalt surface measuring 4,005 by 75 feet (1,221 x 23 m).

For the 12-month period ending July 31, 2007, the airport had 10,800 aircraft operations, an average of 29 per day: 94% general aviation, 5% air taxi and 1% military. At that time there were 47 aircraft based at this airport: 77% single-engine and 23% multi-engine.

Safety Incidents 
On July 12, 2010, a Cirrus SR 20 carrying Kyle Henn, the brother of a victim of the July 2010 World Cup Finals bombing in Uganda, crashed upon landing at the airport. One person was killed during this crash; Henn survived with non-life-threatening injuries and acted to try to save the crash victim after impact.

Closure plans 
The university planned to close the airport to make room for construction of
Carolina North,
a planned major long-term expansion of its campus.

Opposition to closure plans began immediately after the announcement of the planned closure in 2000, when pilots claimed that closing this air field would be a loss of infrastructure that would never be replaced. They noted that upgrades to the airport approved by the FAA had kept pace with current technology, and it was staffed with meticulous attention to detail and careful people, although there have been some complaints about runway maintenance.  The position of general aviation advocates and lobbyists was that there is something very special about airplanes, and to lose them in Chapel Hill for the sake of more buildings, traffic, and population density must be carefully considered. 

Conflict between the town and airport advocates has had a history dating back to the 1980s, revolving around issues such as the location of the airport in a residential area that includes 4 schools, a church, and a YMCA, as well as several crashes in the area that eventually resulted in the university's ejection of a flying club flight school from the airport.  Critics of the airport noticed that the university's first plans for the Carolina North project included keeping the airport in close proximity to occupied buildings and reminded the university that liability in the event of another crash could be substantial, given the existence of guidelines recommending against building so close to a working runway.  In addition, interested private-industry interests indicated concern about the costs and liabilities of building on the site if the airport remained. The plans for Carolina North were revised, and the UNC Board of Trustees commissioned a study on the basis of which they ordered the airport closed.

The university's plans for airport closure were blocked in the state legislature on at least three occasions since the 2000 announcement.  Although some planes using the airport did so on university business, opposition to closure was historically offered primarily by private plane owners and general aviation lobbyists desiring to preserve their access to the airport.  Most recently, opposition efforts focused on the university's planned move of six Area Health Education Centers (AHEC) planes to new facilities at Raleigh-Durham International Airport, to make way for construction of the first phase of the new Carolina North campus project, planned to include teaching, research, and cooperative public-private projects affiliated with the university.  However, economic realities stalled all progress on development of Carolina North, and the airport remained open and active.

In May 2018, a NOTAM appeared announcing the permanent closure of the airport, effective May 15. According to local news sources, the closure will make way for a solar energy project. Airplanes based at Horace Williams were removed from the airport prior to May 1.

References 

One killed in plane crash at Chapel Hill airport :

External links 

 Horace Williams Airport
 Horace Williams Airport: Operations Policy
 Aerial photo as of 2 April 1998 from USGS The National Map
 

Airports in North Carolina
Airports established in 1933
Airports disestablished in 2018
University of North Carolina at Chapel Hill buildings
Buildings and structures in Chapel Hill-Carrboro, North Carolina
University and college airports
Transportation in Orange County, North Carolina
1933 establishments in North Carolina
2018 disestablishments in North Carolina
Defunct airports in North Carolina